Chebyshev's equation is the second order linear differential equation 

where p is a real (or complex) constant. The equation is named after Russian mathematician Pafnuty Chebyshev.

The solutions can be obtained by power series:

where the coefficients obey the recurrence relation

the ratio test to the recurrence.

The recurrence may be started with arbitrary values of a0 and a1,
leading to the two-dimensional space of solutions that arises from second order
differential equations.  The standard choices are:

a0 = 1 ; a1 = 0, leading to the solution

and
a0 = 0 ; a1 = 1, leading to the solution

The general solution is any linear combination of these two.

When p is a non-negative integer, one or the other of the two functions has its series terminate
after a finite number of terms:  F terminates if p is even, and G terminates if p is odd.
In this case, that function is a polynomial of degree p and it is proportional to the
Chebyshev polynomial of the first kind

 if p is even
 if p is odd

Ordinary differential equations